The sport of gliding is managed in each country by national gliding associations, subject to governmental aviation authorities to varying degrees. Internationally the sport is co-ordinated by the FAI Gliding Commission.

 Australia - Gliding Federation of Australia
 Canada - Soaring Association of Canada
 New Zealand - Gliding New Zealand
 South Africa - Soaring Society of South Africa
 Turkey - Turkish Aeronautical Association
 United Kingdom - British Gliding Association
 USA - Soaring Society of America

External links
 Argentina - Federación Argentina de Vuelo a Vela
 Belgium (Flanders) - Liga van Vlaamse Zweefvliegclubs
 Belgium (Wallonia) - Fédération des Clubs Francophones de Vol à Voile
 Denmark - Dansk Svæveflyver Union
 France - Fédération Française de Vol en Planeur
 Germany - Deutscher Aero Club
 Italy - Federazione Italiana Volo a Vela
 Japan - Japan Soaring Association
 Lithuania - Lietuvos Sklandymo Sporto Federacija
 Netherlands - Koninklijke Nederlandse Vereniging voor Luchtvaart
 Norway - Seilflyseksjonen NLF/NAK
 Poland - Polski Aeroklub, Stowarzyszenie Szybownictwa
 Russia - Gliding Federation of Russia
 Sweden - Segelflygförbundet
 Switzerland - Fédération Suisse de Vol à Voile
 Paragliding in Brazil Paragliding in Rio de Janeiro.